Mariko Takahashi may refer to:

, Japanese singer
, Japanese model and actress
, Japanese gymnast
 Mariko "Mari" Takahashi, a member of the YouTube group Smosh